Kamil Kruk (born 13 March 2000) is a Polish professional footballer who plays as a centre-back for Stal Mielec, on loan from Zagłębie Lubin.

Career statistics

References

External links

2000 births
Living people
People from Drezdenko
Polish footballers
Poland youth international footballers
Poland under-21 international footballers
Association football defenders
Ekstraklasa players
III liga players
Zagłębie Lubin players
Stal Mielec players